William Godolphin, Marquess of Blandford ( 1699 – 24 August 1731) was an English nobleman and politician who sat in the House of Commons between 1720 and 1731 .

Godolphin was the eldest son of Francis Godolphin, 2nd Earl of Godolphin and his wife Lady Henrietta Godolphin, née Churchill. His grandparents were the Earl and Countess of Godolphin and the Duke and Duchess of Marlborough.

In 1712 his father succeeded as 2nd Earl of Godolphin (Lord Godolphin had been promoted in 1706). As heir-apparent to the earldom, William assumed the courtesy title Viscount Rialton. He was educated at Pembroke College, Cambridge.

On 9 June 1720, Hugh Boscawen, the Member of Parliament for Penryn, was raised to the House of Lords as Viscount Falmouth. Lord Rialton was elected to the House of Commons in his place on 24 June 1720, sitting as a Whig. He was related to Lord Falmouth on both his father's and his mother's side, as Falmouth was a grandson of Sir Francis Godolphin and had married Charlotte Godfrey, daughter of Arabella Churchill. Rialton represented Penryn for the remainder of the Parliament and was not re-elected in the general election of 1722.

On 16 June 1722 Lord Rialton's maternal grandfather the Duke of Marlborough died, and was succeeded by his daughter Henrietta under a special Act of Parliament. William Godolphin was now heir-apparent to his mother's dukedom as well as his father's earldom, and adopted the higher courtesy title of Marquess of Blandford. He returned to Parliament at the general election of 1727, being elected for Woodstock on 21 August.

On 25 April 1729 Lord Blandford married Maria Catherina de Jong, the daughter of Peter de Jong, a mayor of Utrecht. Lady Blandford's sister Isabella was wife of the Earl of Denbigh. On 30 August 1730 he was made an honorary Doctor of Civil Laws by the University of Oxford.

Lord Blandford died at Balliol College, Oxford of apoplexy on 24 August 1731.  Lord Egmont noted in his diary that this was probably brought on by a drinking bout. As he had no children and no surviving brother, the heir to the Dukedom of Marlborough was now his first cousin the Earl of Sunderland. Lord Sunderland's brother John Spencer was elected to Parliament in Blandford's place on 22 January 1732. The Earldom of Godolphin now had no heir, but Lord Godolphin was granted a barony in 1735 that would allow more distant members of the Godolphin family to succeed.

Lady Blandford remarried on 1 June 1734, Harlington, Middlesex, the Tory MP Sir William Wyndham, as his second wife. She was widowed again on 17 June 1740 and died at Sheen on 7 September 1779.

Notes

1700 births
1731 deaths
British courtesy marquesses
Alumni of Pembroke College, Cambridge
Heirs apparent who never acceded
Rialton, William Godolphin, Viscount
Rialton, William Godolphin, Viscount
British MPs 1727–1734
Whig (British political party) MPs for English constituencies
William